Alegre Records was a New York City record label specialized in latin music.  It was founded in 1956 by Al Santiago who owned a 1950s record store at 8522 Westchester Avenue in The Bronx named Casalegre and co-founded by clothing businessman Ben Perlman. It specialized in Latin music and was significant for featuring artists such as Johnny Pacheco and Tito Puente and was the first to record a series of great Latin artists, from Johnny Pacheco, Eddie Palmieri, through Willie Colón. It has been called the "Blue Note" of Latin music.

In 1960, Johnny Pacheco's first orchestra had signed with Alegre Records and their first album titled “Johnny Pacheco y Su Charanga” sold over 100,000 copies within the first year and was the biggest selling album in Latin music history up to that point.

In 1961, Al Santiago created the Alegre All Stars (also spelled Alegre All-Stars), remembering the well-known Cuban Jam Sessions ("Descargas Cubanas") in the 1950s on the Panart Records label. Johnny Pacheco got his friend, the trombonist Barry Rogers, to play with the Alegre All-Stars which featured a unique instrumentation of flute, tenor sax, and trombone. Fred Weinberg was Santiago's and the labels favorite sound engineer who also  recorded many of the artists individually.

In 1975 Alegre Records was sold to Fania Records.

See also 
 List of record labels
1956 in music

References

Further reading 
 Rondón, César Miguel, The Book of Salsa: A Chronicle of Urban Music from the Caribbean to New York City, translated by Frances R. Aparicio with Jackie White, University of North Carolina Press, 2008. . Cf. Index.
 Washburne, Christopher, Sounding Salsa: performing Latin music in New York City, Temple University Press, June 28, 2008. . Cf. pp. 17, 19.
 The House That Al Built: The Alegre Records Story 1957-1977, 2-CD Set CD (Fania / Emusica - Remastered Edition 130 315), Released 2008
 Boggs, Vernon W., "Salsiology: Afro-Cuban music and the evolution of salsa in New York City", New York : Greenwood Press, 1992. 
 Child, John, "Profile of Al Santiago", The Descarga Review, February 23, 1999

External links
 The House that Al Built - review of historical CD set at The Descarga Review.

American record labels
Record labels established in 1956
Record labels disestablished in 1975
Latin American music record labels
Companies based in the Bronx
Fania Records
1956 establishments in New York City
1975 disestablishments in New York (state)